Eugenio Colombo (born 10 December 1953 in Rome, Italy) is an Italian saxophonist and flautist most associated with avant-garde jazz. A founding member of the Italian Instabile Orchestra, Colombo has worked with such musicians as Mario Schiano, Giorgio Gaslini, Steve Lacy, Bruno Tommaso, Maurizio Giammarco, Giancarlo Schiaffini and the band Area.

Discography

As contributor

References

1953 births
Avant-garde jazz flautists
Avant-garde jazz saxophonists
Musicians from Rome
Living people
21st-century saxophonists
Italian Instabile Orchestra members
Leo Records artists
21st-century flautists